Thomas Coman (August, 1836 – October 22, 1909) was President of the New York City Board of Aldermen from 1868 to 1871, and Acting Mayor of New York for several weeks at the end of 1868 and beginning of 1869.

Biography
Coman was born in Ireland in August, 1836 and his family immigrated to the United States when he was two years old. They settled in New York City, and Coman was educated locally and graduated from the New York City College in 1856.

At the start of his career, Coman worked as a printer, a reporter for the New York Herald, and a clerk in the New York City Post Office.

He was later admitted to the bar, practiced law, and served as a Magistrate of the New York City Police Court.

In September 1856 Coman became a volunteer firefighter when he joined Eagle Engine Company Number 13. He was soon elected Secretary, and in 1859 won election as Foreman. He was reelected annually until 1864 and was still in command when the volunteer fire department was replaced by a paid department in 1865. During the draft riots in 1863 Coman's fire company was among the fire units that performed law enforcement duties and aided the police and military in restoring order.

A Democrat and member of the Tammany Hall organization, Coman served on the New York City Board of Aldermen from 1868 to 1871. As the board's president, he became acting mayor when John Thompson Hoffman resigned  to become governor. A. Oakey Hall was elected to succeed Hoffman as mayor, and Coman served from Hoffman's resignation on December 1, 1868, until Hall's swearing-in on January 4, 1869.

After he left his alderman's seat, Mayor Hall appointed Coman one of the commissioners to oversee construction of the New York County Courthouse.  In 1873 Coman and the other commissioners were indicted for conspiracy related to the Tweed Ring's corruption in the construction of the courthouse.  He was also sued in civil court with one of his fellow commissioners, with the city seeking to claim city money it said they had obtained by fraud. By 1876 the criminal case had ended with a Nolle prosequi decision by the district attorney, and the civil suit had been discontinued.

Coman worked for The Equitable Life Assurance Society for more than twenty years, serving as a liaison to the city government responsible for resolving property tax disputes and code violations on company real estate, and assisting company executives in their dealings with city officials. In 1905 he testified in a New York State Legislature investigation into corruption in city government. His work for The Equitable was the subject of negative headlines, but he was not charged with any crimes.

He died in New York City on October 22, 1909.  His funeral took place at New York City's Church of the Blessed Sacrament.  (Some sources indicate the date of death as October 20. This seems to be in error, and was probably the date Coman's final illness was first reported.)

Coman was married to Martha Beechinor (d. July 19, 1920), and they were the parents of five children.

Notes

References
The Encyclopedia of New York City, edited by Kenneth T. Jackson (Yale University Press and The New York Historical Society, 1995)

1836 births
1909 deaths
City College of New York alumni
New York City firefighters
New York (state) Democrats
New York (state) lawyers
New York (state) state court judges
New York City Council members
Mayors of New York City
19th-century American politicians
19th-century American judges
Irish emigrants to the United States (before 1923)